Western Australia Day or simply WA Day (formerly known as Foundation Day) is a public holiday in Western Australia (WA), celebrated on the first Monday in June each year to commemorate the founding of the Swan River Colony in 1829. Because of the date of Western Australia Day, WA does not have the King's Official Birthday public holiday in June, as do the other Australian states; it is held in September or October instead.

Background
HMS Challenger, under Captain Charles Fremantle, anchored off Garden Island on 25 April 1829. Fremantle officially claimed the western part of Australia for Britain on 2 May. The merchant vessel Parmelia – with the new colony's administrator Lieutenant-Governor James Stirling, other officials, and civilian settlers on board – arrived on the night of 31 May and sighted the coast on 1 June. It finally anchored in Cockburn Sound on 6 June. The warship HMS Sulphur arrived on 8 June, carrying the British Army garrison. The Swan River Colony was officially proclaimed by Stirling on 11 June.

Ships carrying more civilian settlers began arriving in August, and on the King's birthday, 12 August, the wife of the captain of Sulphur, Helena Dance, standing in for James Stirling's wife Ellen Stirling, cut down a tree to mark the founding of the colony's capital, Perth.

In 1832, Stirling decided that an annual celebration was needed to unite the colony's inhabitants, including both settlers and Aboriginal Australians and "masters and servants". He decided that the commemoration would be held on 1 June each year (or if a Sunday, on the following Monday), the date originally planned by Stirling for Parmelias arrival in recognition of the first and greatest British naval victory over the French in 1794, the "Glorious First of June".

The holiday was celebrated as Foundation Day up until 2011; in 2012, it was renamed Western Australia Day as part of a series of law changes recognising Aboriginal Australians as the original inhabitants of Western Australia.

References

Public holidays in Australia
June observances
Society in Western Australia
Winter events in Australia